Paradaxata is a genus of longhorn beetles of the subfamily Lamiinae, containing the following species:

 Paradaxata alboplagiata Breuning, 1938
 Paradaxata spinosa Breuning, 1938
 Paradaxata villosa Breuning, 1938

References

Pteropliini